Saint Augustine's University is a private historically black Christian college in Raleigh, North Carolina. It was founded by Episcopal clergy in 1867 for the education of freed slaves.

History 
Founded in 1867 as Saint Augustine's Normal School, the  name of the school changed to Saint Augustine's School in 1893 and Saint Augustine's Junior College in 1919, when it began offering college-level coursework. It began offering coursework leading to a four-year degree in 1927 and changed its name to Saint Augustine's College one year later with the first baccalaureate degrees awarded in 1931. In 2012, the institution again expanded its focus and changed its name to St. Augustine's University.

In April 2014, in the midst of what The Chronicle of Higher Education characterized as "significant turmoil" and Diverse: Issues in Higher Education described as "financial problems...stemming from a loss in enrollment and revenue", the college's board of trustees fired university president Dianne Boardley Suber one month prior to her planned retirement. At the same time, the board reinstated two senior employees that Suber had recently fired. Suber had led the university for nearly 15 years.

Everett Ward was appointed president in 2015 after serving as interim president since 2014. Gaddis Faulcon was named interim president in 2019.

Radio and television stations
Saint Augustine's University was the nation's first historically black college to have its own on-campus commercial radio and television stations (WAUG 750 AM, WAUG-TV 8, and Time Warner cable channel 10). It is one of two colleges or universities in the Raleigh/Durham area to offer a degree in film production.

Honorary degree for Robert Mugabe
Of the 5 colleges in the Western world which have awarded honorary degrees to controversial Zimbabwean president Robert Mugabe, Saint Augustine's University is one of only 2 which has not revoked the award (in this case, a Legum Doctor).

2011 social media controversy
In 2011, the college barred a student from participation in the 2011 commencement exercises because of a negative comment he had made on the college's Facebook page. Shortly thereafter, the student initiated a lawsuit against the college in North Carolina State Court which was later settled out of court.

2013 summer camp employees controversy
In the summer of 2013, local news affiliates reported that two convicted murderers had been hired by the college to work for a children's summer camp. Although the college defended the employees as "exemplary employees and productive members of the community", the college reassigned them.

Campus

Emery Gymnasium, George "Pup" Williams Track & Field Stadium, Penick Hall of Math & Sciences, Charles Mosee Building (Office of Academic Affairs), Delany Hall (Office of Financial Aid & Admissions), Joseph C. Gordan Health & Science Center, The Prezell R. Robinson Library, Cheshire Building (Division of Business), Tuttle Hall of Military Sciences, Goold Hall Student Union, Charles H. Boyer Administration Building (Office of the President), Hunter Administration Bldg., Hermitage Faculty Bldg., Benson Bldg. of Technology, Seby Jones Fine Arts Center, the Historic Chapel and:
 St. Agnes Hospital - Rev. and Mrs. A.B. Hunter founded St. Agnes Hospital in 1895. I.L. Collins gave $600 of the $1,100 raised to start the hospital, which was named for Collins' late wife Agnes. The hospital opened in the residence of Robert B. Sutton, the school's third principal.  By 1904, despite improvements, St. Agnes needed to expand, and Mrs. Hunter raised half the $15,000 needed. Under the direction of Bishop Henry Beard Delany it became a 75-bed center "built of stone quarried on the St. Augustine's campus" that opened in 1909. For many years St. Agnes was "the only well-equipped hospital ... with one exception" for blacks between New Orleans and Washington D.C., and served 75,000 black people in the three states. The building was severely damaged by fire in December 1926. One of its most famous patients was boxer Jack Johnson, who was taken there following a fatal 1946 auto accident near Franklinton, NC. Part of the building still remains, and is regarded as a historic property, but the hospital has not operated since 1961.
 Saint Augustine's College Historic Chapel - The college cornerstone was laid in 1895 under the guidance of Reverend Henry Beard Delany, the first African-American Bishop elected to the Episcopal Church and the first Bishop to graduate from the college. The chapel was made possible through the acquisition by the Freedmen's Bureau and is one of the oldest landmarks at St. Augustine's University.  Current chaplain of the chapel is the Rev. Nita Johnson Byrd.
 Martin Luther King Jr. Reception Center Center - Built in 1973, it was previously the school's Student Union and now holds the cafeteria, mailing room, bookstore, and ballroom.

The campus hosts grades 11-13 of Wake Young Men's Leadership Academy.

Student enrollment
In recent years, the college 's annual enrollment has approximated 800-1000 students, about half from North Carolina with the remainder coming from 37 states, the District of Columbia, the U.S. Virgin Islands, Jamaica, and 30 foreign countries. Its faculty consists of nearly 100 people.

Academics

Student activities

Clubs and activities
 Student Honors Association
 Student Leaders Organization
 Student Government Association
 Homecoming Committee
 CAB (Campus Activities Board)
 CFO (Christian Fellowship Organization)
 New Beginnings Gospel Choir
 BlueChip Cheerleading Squad
 Collegiate 100 of the 100 Black Men
 Carter G. Woodson History Club
 FAME (Federation of Artist in Media Entertainment)
 Falcon Poetry Club
 Phi Beta Lambda (National Business Association)
 Nubiance Modeling Troupe
 Belle J'Adore Modeling Troupe
 ISA International Student Organization
 Marching/Jazz/Pep Band
 Falcon Battalion/Army ROTC
 National Association for the Advancement of Colored People
 Foreign Language Club
 Falcons for the Cause
 Falcon Fanatikz Pep Squad
 Residence Halls Association
 Psychology Club
 SAC Association for Black Journalists
 Sociology Club
 Students in Free Enterprise
 Students North Carolina Association of Educators (SNCAE)
 TRIO Academic Achievers Program (Federally Funded Program) (First Generational Students)

Honor societies
 Alpha Kappa Delta Honor Society
 Alpha Kappa Mu national honor society
 Beta Kappa Chi national honor society
 Delta Mu business administration honor society
 Phi Eta Sigma national honor society
 Phi Beta Lambda
 Phi Kappa Delta

Greek letter organizations
 Alpha Phi Alpha fraternity – Gamma Psi chapter
 Alpha Kappa Alpha sorority – Gamma Xi chapter
 Kappa Alpha Psi fraternity – Gamma Omicron chapter
 Omega Psi Phi fraternity – Kappa Epsilon chapter
 Delta Sigma Theta sorority – Gamma Rho chapter
 Phi Beta Sigma fraternity – Beta Xi chapter
 Zeta Phi Beta sorority – Phi Beta chapter
 Sigma Gamma Rho sorority – Nu chapter
 Iota Phi Theta fraternity-Theta Phi chapter
 Alpha Phi Omega national service fraternity  –  Upsilon Kappa chapter (Inactive)
 Kappa Kappa Psi national honorary band fraternity – Nu Eta chapter
 Tau Beta Sigma national honorary band sorority – Prospect

Social fellowships 
 Groove Phi Groove social fellowship
 Swing Phi Swing social fellowship

Gateway Program
The mission of "The Gateway Lifelong Learning Program" is to offer non-traditional, continuing and alternative academic educational opportunities for adult learners. The Gateway Program is designed to give working, non-traditional and community college transfer students an option to pursue a degree and/or personal/professional development. These academic programs address the learning needs of employed adults who prefer an educational delivery system that is participatory and experientially related to the workplace. An example of an educational program consistent with the lifelong learning philosophy is the Organizational Management (OM) major, which is offered through the college's Gateway Program. This unique program offers an ideal alternative academic opportunity for the employed adult to complete the Bachelor of Science degree in an accelerated format while attending classes during the evening each week.

Athletics

Saint Augustine's competes in NCAA Division II  in the Central Intercollegiate Athletic Association. Varsity sports include:
 Baseball (see also: USA Baseball National Training Complex)
 Cheerleading
 Football
 Softball
 Men's Golf
 Women's Bowling
 Women's Volleyball
 Men's/Women's Basketball
 Men's/Women's Cross-Country
 Men's/Women's Tennis
 Men's/Women's Outdoor Track
 Men's/Women's Indoor Track

Notable alumni

References

Relevant literature
Suttell, Brian. 2023. Campus to Counter: Civil Rights in Raleigh and Durham, North Carolina, 1960-1963. Macon, GA: Mercer University Press.

External links

 
 Official athletics website

University and college buildings on the National Register of Historic Places in North Carolina
Historically black universities and colleges in the United States
Universities and colleges in the Research Triangle
 
Educational institutions established in 1867
Universities and colleges in Raleigh, North Carolina
Universities and colleges affiliated with the Episcopal Church (United States)
1867 establishments in North Carolina
Liberal arts colleges in North Carolina
Historic districts on the National Register of Historic Places in North Carolina
National Register of Historic Places in Wake County, North Carolina
Historically black hospitals in the United States